Cory Kendrix (born Cory Andrew Kennedy; July 24, 1988) is an American independent rapper, emcee, singer-songwriter, music producer and hip hop artist based out of Denver, Colorado. In 2014, he released the IGNORANCE LP as well as the Worth Something EP with Red Bull Music Academy 2013 graduate Anna Love. During 2015, Cory performed at SXSW, Pop Montreal and the Denver Westword Music Showcase. He released his debut R&B solo EP in 2017 entitled Me Right Now under the LNS Crew imprint and then released GUMBO  under Davies Entertainment in 2021.

Discography 

 IGNORANCE (2014)
 Worth Something EP (2014)
 Me Right Now EP (2017)
 GUMBO (2021)

References

External links
 Official Cory Kendrix Twitter
 Official Site

Living people
Musicians from Austin, Texas
American hip hop record producers
American hip hop singers
Singers from Oregon
Singers from Colorado
Singers from Texas
1988 births
Rappers from Oregon
Rappers from Colorado
Songwriters from Colorado
Musicians from Denver
People from Denver
People from Curry County, Oregon
American male rappers
Southern hip hop musicians
21st-century American singers
American hip hop musicians
American male songwriters
Songwriters from Texas
Songwriters from Oregon
21st-century American rappers
Record producers from Texas
21st-century American male singers
Port Orford, Oregon